The Television Trophy (TV Trophy for short) is a greyhound racing competition held annually. It was inaugurated in 1952 and shown on the BBC. A different venue was chosen each year over the marathon distance of the relevant track. The competition consisted of heats (normally three) and a final one week later.

The BBC continued to televise the event from 1952 until 1996 on Sportsview (later Sportsnight). When Sportsnight ended the competition coverage it switched to Sky Sports which resulted in two editions of the 1997 event, the first being the last BBC event and the second sponsored by the Evening Standard being the inaugural Sky event. In 2018 the Greyhound Board of Great Britain, who hold the rights of the competition, invited tracks to tender for its hosting following the shock closure of Towcester Greyhound Stadium. Crayford and Romford were chosen for the 2018 and 2019 editions.

Scurlogue Champ, Ericas Equity, Midway Skipper and Aayamza Royale are the only greyhounds to have won the event twice, while trainers Mark Wallis has trained four winners.

Past winners

Sponsors
1958–1997 (BBC)
1997–2000 (Evening Standard)
2001–2001 (Countrywide Steel & Tubes)
2002–2009 (William Hill)
2010–2010 (Betfair)
2011–2011 (Blue Square)
2013–2013 (Paddy Power)
2014–2014 (Roto Roof Windows)
2015–2017 (Colossus Bets)
2012, 2018, 2021 (Ladbrokes)
2019–2022 (Coral)

References

Greyhound racing competitions in the United Kingdom
Recurring sporting events established in 1958
Sport in Northamptonshire
British sports television series
Sky UK original programming